Ayesha is a 2020 Pakistani drama web television series, presented by GlaxoSmithKline and directed by Najaf Bilgrami. First episode of the series aired online on 8 February 2020. It features Yasra Rizvi, Sarmad Khoosat, Shees Sajjad and Maham Amir.

It is the story of Ayesha, a middle aged housewife who dedicated her life for her family but she doesn't get valued and attention which she deserves from her family.

Plot 
Ayesha is the story of a married homemaker in an urban set-up who lives with her one child and a husband. Her life revolves around her husband who is an egoist and practical and one grown child. To the world, her family seems nothing short of a dream. However, Ayesha soon starts to realize that her very own husband takes her for granted and that her world is shallow and lonely. And amidst the quest of caring for his every need, she never took the time to carve her own identity and harness her talent for being a YouTuber. She soon embarks on a journey to create an identity for herself - which has more layers than that of a wife and mother – one of that of an individual.

Cast 

Yasra Rizvi as Ayesha Ahmed
Sarmad Khoosat as Fahad Ahmed
Shees Sajjad as Ali Ahmed; Ayesha and Fahad's son
Maham Amir as Sasha; Ayesha's friend
Zubair Akram as Fahad's colleague
Sana Gilani as Beautician

References

2020 Pakistani television series debuts
2020 web series debuts
Pakistani web series